Maharaja Ganga Singh University (MGSU), formerly University of Bikaner (UOB), is a university located in Bikaner district of Rajasthan, India. The university was established in 2003.

Vice chancellor
Vinod Kumar Singh is the vice-chancellor of MGSU.

Faculty
The university has faculties of commerce and management, science, arts, social sciences, law and education. The university runs a number of professional courses including B.Sc., M.Sc., B.Ed., M.Ed., B.P.Ed., BCA, MCM (Master of Computer Management), PGDCA, BBA, MBA, PGDSM, BFA, L.L.B., L.L.M., Diploma in Labour Law, Diploma, B.Com., M.Com., B.A. and M.A.

References

External links 
 

Universities and colleges in Bikaner
Universities in Rajasthan
Educational institutions established in 2003
2003 establishments in Rajasthan